The 2011 Population and Housing Census (PHC 2011) ( (REL 2011)). was a census that was carried out during 31 December 2011 – 31 March 2012 in Estonia by Statistics Estonia.

The total actual population recorded was 1,294,455 persons.

See also
Demographics of Estonia

References

External links
Results  at Statistics Estonia

Censuses in Estonia
Demographics of Estonia
Ethnic groups in Estonia
2011 in Estonia
Estonia